This is a list of awards and nominations received by Winner, a South Korean boy band who debuted under YG Entertainment in August 2014. Winner has received a total of 17 awards out of 82 nominations.

Korean

Asia Artist Awards

Circle Chart Music Awards (formerly Gaon Chart Music Awards)

Golden Disc Awards

MBC Plus X Genie Music Awards

Melon Music Awards

Mnet Asian Music Awards

Seoul Music Awards

Soribada Best K-Music Awards

Chinese

Tudou Young Choice Awards

QQ Music Awards

MTV Asia Music Gala

Other awards

Notes

References 

Winner
Awards